Milky Way is a brand of chocolate-covered confectionery bar manufactured and marketed by Mars, Incorporated. There are two varieties: the US Milky Way bar, which is sold as the Mars bar worldwide, including Canada; and the
global Milky Way bar, which is sold as the 3 Musketeers in the US and Canada. (In Canada neither bar is sold as Milky Way.)

US version

The Milky Way bar is made of nougat, topped with caramel and covered with milk chocolate. It was created in 1923 by Frank C. Mars and originally manufactured in Minneapolis, Minnesota, the name and taste derived from a then-popular malted milk drink (milkshake) of the day, not after the astronomical galaxy.

On March 10, 1925, the Milky Way trademark was registered in the US, claiming a first-use date of 1922. In 1924, the Milky Way bar was introduced nationally, with sales totalling $800,000 that year. The chocolate for the chocolate coating was supplied by Hershey's.

By 1926, two variants were available: chocolate nougat with milk chocolate coating, and vanilla nougat with a dark chocolate coating, each selling for 5¢. In June 1932, the bar was marketed as a two-piece bar, and four years later, in 1936, the chocolate and vanilla were separated.  The vanilla version with a dark chocolate coating was called "Forever Yours"  and was marketed under this name until 1979, then Milky Way Dark was reintroduced in 1989. Forever Yours was renamed "Milky Way Dark" and later "Milky Way Midnight".

In 1935, Mars used the marketing slogan "The sweet you can eat between meals," later using "At work, rest and play, you get three great tastes in a Milky Way."  By 2006, Mars used the slogan "Comfort in every bar" in the US and most recently "Life's better the Milky Way."

In 2010, the Milky Way Simply Caramel bar went on sale, a version with caramel covered in milk chocolate and without nougat. In 2011, Mars introduced a small size (marketed as fun size) Simply Caramel bar. A salted caramel version has since been introduced.

In 2012, Milky Way Caramel Apple Minis went on sale as a limited offer for the Halloween season.

In late summer of 2018, Milky Way Fudge, which substitutes the malt nougat with chocolate fudge nougat, was introduced nationwide.

The American Milky Way bar has 240 calories in each 52.2 gram bar; the smaller Milky Way Midnight has 220 calories in each 50 gram bar; and the Milky Way Simply Caramel bar has 250 calories in each 54 gram bar.

Marketing
In November 2012, a new print and digital advertising campaign was launched in the US called "Sorry, I was eating a Milky Way". The campaign portrayed the comical aftermath of what happens after someone (off camera) is distracted due to eating a Milky Way bar. This campaign originated from the suggestion that eating a Milky Way bar may be a slow, involved process.

Global version

The version of the Milky Way bar sold outside the United States has no caramel topping, and consists of a nougat centre that is considerably lighter than that of the British Mars bar and the American Milky Way bar. The global Milky Way bar is marketed in the United States as 3 Musketeers bar. Because of this low density (0.88 g/cm3), it floats in milk, an attribute highlighted in an advertising campaign in several European countries.

Originally available within Europe only in chocolate flavor, the center was revised to vanilla flavor around 1993, though the chocolate flavor still remains available in Australia. The bar is also available in banana, mango, and strawberry flavors.

In the UK, Mars introduced the Flyte bar which was identical to the old-style chocolate flavored Milky Way, was marketed in twin packs and discontinued in 2015. Also available in Europe are Milky Way Crispy Rolls, chocolate-covered wafer rolls with milk-cream fillings.

A variant of the Milky Way bar branded 'Milky Way Magic Stars' is marketed in the UK, with small aerated chocolate star shapes. Each star is engraved with a different smiley face, representing one of the "magic star" characters portrayed on the packaging and referenced in the advertising: Pop Star, Jess Star, Bright Star, Super Star, Twinkle Star, Falling Star, Happy Star, Sport Star, Clever Star and Baby Star. Subsequently, reference to the characters was dropped, the packaging since depicting blank stars, although the faces remain in the chocolates themselves.

Calorie count varies. The British version of the Milky Way bar has .

Marketing

A long-running advertising slogan for the product in the United Kingdom and Australia was, "The sweet you can eat between meals without ruining your appetite". In 1991, the Health Education Authority and anti-sugar lobbyists both complained, without success, to the Independent Television Commission that such advertising encouraged children to eat sweets between meals. The ITC agreed with Mars that its advertisements in fact encouraged restrained eating.

Once marketed as a snack food that would not intrude on regular meals, modern marketing portrays the Milky Way as a snack reducing mealtime hunger and curbing the appetite between meals.

A widely known advertisement was debuted in 1989, featuring a red 1951 Buick Roadmaster and a vehicle that resembles a blue 1959 Cadillac Series 62 (lacking its dual headlights) racing, with the former eating everything in sight and the latter eating a Milky Way. The advertisement ends with the bridge to Dinnertown being out and the now fat red car being too heavy to jump the gap while the blue car makes the jump. The advertisement returned albeit edited in 2009, removing the claim that the Milky Way is not an appetite spoiler.

A variant of the car commercial is one that takes place in outer space and features a race between a satellite and a meteor.

See also
 List of chocolate bar brands

References

External links

 Milky Way bar website (US)

American confectionery
Chocolate bars
American brands
Mars confectionery brands
Products introduced in 1923
Brand name confectionery